Lambertus "Lamme" Benenga (February 17, 1886 in Rotterdam – August 3, 1963 in Geldrop) was a Dutch freestyle swimmer who competed in the 1908 Summer Olympics.

He participated in the 100 metre freestyle competition, but he was eliminated in the first round.

He is the older brother of Bouke Benenga.

References

1886 births
1963 deaths
Dutch male freestyle swimmers
Swimmers at the 1908 Summer Olympics
Olympic swimmers of the Netherlands
Swimmers from Rotterdam